Dilburnu Nature Park is a nature park in Istanbul Province, Turkey.

Geography
Dilburnu (literally "Cape Tongue") is situated on the western part of Büyükada (literally: Big Island), the biggest of the Princes' Islands, a group of nine islands in the Sea of Marmara, in Adalar district southeast of Istanbul Province. Dilburnu and its surrounding area were declared a nature park by the Ministry of Environment and Forest in 2011.

See also
Büyükada Nature Park, on the eastern part of Büyükada
Değirmenburnu Nature Park, on the neighborlng island Heybeliada

References

Nature parks in Turkey
Protected areas established in 2011
2011 establishments in Turkey
Parks in Istanbul
Adalar